Rejects on the Road is a Nasty Idols Live DVD release and currently the only to be released.

DVD Track listing

Bonus Material

Personnel
 Andy Pierce - Vocals and acoustic guitar
 Peter Espinoza - Lead Guitar and synthesizers
 Dick Qwarfort - Bass
 Rikki Dahl - Drums

References

2012 video albums
Nasty Idols albums